Dennis Chembezi (born 15 January 1997) is a Malawian professional footballer who plays as a centre-back for South African National First Division club Black Leopards and the Malawi national team.

References

External links

1997 births
Living people
Malawian footballers
Malawi international footballers
People from Zomba District
Association football central defenders
Mighty Wanderers FC players
Polokwane City F.C. players
Black Leopards F.C. players
South African Premier Division players
National First Division players
Malawian expatriate footballers
Malawian expatriate sportspeople in South Africa
Expatriate soccer players in South Africa
2021 Africa Cup of Nations players